Dimitrios Priftis (born October 27, 1968) is a Greek professional basketball coach who was most recently served as the head coach for Tofaş of the Turkish Basketbol Süper Ligi.

Club coaching career
After having previously worked as the head coach of Kavala and Ikaros Kallitheas, Prifitis became the head coach of Kolossos Rodou in 2013.

He was hired as an assistant coach at Panathinaikos in 2014. He then became the head coach of Aris later that same year. He was named the Greek League Best Coach in 2016.

He became the head coach of the Russian VTB United League club, UNICS Kazan, in 2017.

On June 26, 2021, he became the head coach of Panathinaikos, signing a three-year deal with the "Greens". On April 12, 2022, Priftis was fired from his position, after a series of negative results and a catastrophic season in the EuroLeague.

On June 16, 2022, he has signed with Tofaş of the Turkish Basketbol Süper Ligi.

National team career
Priftis has also worked as an assistant coach of the senior men's Greek national basketball team between 2008 and 2012, and from 2014 to the present. He has worked as an assistant coach with Greece at the following tournaments: the 2008 FIBA World Olympic Qualifying Tournament, the 2008 Summer Olympics, the EuroBasket 2009, the 2010 FIBA World Championship, the EuroBasket 2011, the 2012 FIBA World Olympic Qualifying Tournament, the 2014 FIBA Basketball World Cup, the EuroBasket 2015, and the 2016 Turin FIBA World Olympic Qualifying Tournament.

Continental coaching record

EuroLeague

|-
| align="left" rowspan=1|Panathinaikos
| align="left" |2021–22
|28||9||19|||| align="center"|Eliminated in the regular season
|-!
| align="center" colspan=2|Career||28||9||19||||

References

External links
EuroCup Profile
FIBA Coaching Profile
FIBA EuroChallenge Profile
Panathinaikos B.C. Profile
FCM.com Profile

1968 births
Living people
AEK B.C. coaches
Aris B.C. coaches
Basketball players from Athens
BC UNICS coaches
Greek basketball coaches
Ikaros B.C. coaches
Kavala B.C. coaches
Kolossos Rodou B.C. coaches
Panathinaikos B.C. coaches
Tofaş S.K. coaches